libcanberra is a free and open-source implementation of the freedesktop.org name and sound theme specifications. It supports several backends, including ALSA, PulseAudio, OSS, and GStreamer. It is named after Canberra, the capital city of Australia.

References

External link 
 Official website

Audio libraries
Audio software for Linux
Free audio software